The 2020 Challenger Banque Nationale de Drummondville was a professional tennis tournament played on indoor hard courts. It was the 14th edition of the tournament and part of the 2020 ATP Challenger Tour. It took place in Drummondville, Canada between February 16 and 23, 2020.

Singles main-draw entrants

Seeds

1 Rankings are as of February 10, 2020.

Other entrants
The following players received wildcards into the singles main draw:
 Taha Baadi
 Kamen Damov
 Filip Peliwo
 Ilya Tiraspolsky
 David Volfson

The following player received entry into the singles main draw using a protected ranking:
  Raymond Sarmiento

The following player received entry into the singles main draw as an alternate:
  Boris Arias

The following players received entry from the qualifying draw:
  Razvan Baiant
  Washi Gervais

The following player received entry as a lucky loser:
  Tony Bourcet

Champions

Singles

 Maxime Cressy def.  Arthur Rinderknech 6–7(4–7), 6–4, 6–4.

Doubles

 Manuel Guinard /  Arthur Rinderknech def.  Roberto Cid Subervi /  Gonçalo Oliveira 7–6(7–4), 7–6(7–3).

References

External links
Official website

2020 ATP Challenger Tour
2020
2020 in Canadian tennis
February 2020 sports events in Canada